Ethmia sandra is a moth in the family Depressariidae. It is found from Mexico to El Salvador and Costa Rica.

The ground color of the forewings is uniform pale gray, at times with an irregular, whitish clouding around markings. These markings are black, longitudinally elongate spots. The ground color of the hindwings is semitranslucent whitish, becoming brown at the margins beyond the middle and in the apical area.

No host plant information is available, but oviposition evidently occurs into flowers, since all female specimens possess considerable pollen on the abdomen, a phenomenon not observed in any other Ethmiidae species.

References

Moths described in 1973
sandra